was a town located in Chikujō District, Fukuoka Prefecture. On 10 April 1955, the town merged with 8 villages to form the city of Unoshima. 4 days later, the city was renamed to the city of Buzen.

History
1 April 1889 - Due to the municipal status enforcement, the town of Hachiya was formed within Kōge District.
26 February 1896 - Kōge District merged with Tsuiki District to become Chikujō District.
1 April 1935 - Merged with the town of Unoshima to become the town of Hachiya.
10 April 1955 - The town of Hachiya and the surrounding 8 villages merged to form the city of Unoshima. The town of Hachiya dissolves.
14 April 1955 - The city's name was renamed to the city of Buzen.

See also
 List of dissolved municipalities of Japan
 Unoshima, Fukuoka
 Buzen, Fukuoka

Dissolved municipalities of Fukuoka Prefecture
Populated places established in 1889
Populated places disestablished in 1955